The EWF Heavyweight Championship is the top professional wrestling title in the Southern California-based Empire Wrestling Federation independent promotion. It was established in 1996, with Bobby Bradley as the first champion, who defeated Zuma to win it. There have been a total of 33 recognized champions who have had a combined 45 official reigns.

Title history

See also
Empire Wrestling Federation

References

External links
  EWF Heavyweight Championship
Empire Wrestling Federation championships
Heavyweight wrestling championships
Regional professional wrestling championships